Emmanuil Lipkind (1928–2007) was a Russian-Israeli painter. He was born in Kazan, Russia and lived in Moscow beginning in 1964. In 1994, he moved with his wife to Israel. He was a member of the International Association of Art (UNESCO) and of the Russian Artist Union. Many of his works are kept in Russian museums, in the Yad va Shem Memorial in Israel as well as in private collections. Lipkind worked in Latvia, former Yugoslavia, Middle Asian Countries and Israel.

He died in 2007 in Jerusalem.

Education 

 1948–1954 Master of Arts degree at the Latvian Academy of Art, Riga, Latvia
 1947–1948 Spent a year at the Leningrad Art College
 1942–1947 Graduated with distinction from Kazan Art College

Teaching 

 1966–1994 Moscow Art College, Russia, Senior Teacher
 1954–1961 Kazan Art College, Russia, teacher of painting, drawing and composition

Awards and prizes 

 1999–2000 Keren Hayyesod Project for Calendar for the year 5760 (1999–2000)
 1997 Shoshana and Mordechay Ish-Shalom Prize for Painting
 1966–1987 Moscow Art College named after the 1905th Year, senior Teacher
 1957 Prize of the 6th International Youth Festival in Moscow
 1954–1961 Kazan Art College, teacher of painting, drawing and composition

Selected solo exhibitions 

 2012 Beit Shmuel Art Gallery the "Dialogue and Landscape", Jerusalem, with Anna Khodorkovski
 2010 The Jerusalem House of Quality presents "Light and Color"
 2003 Theatron Yerushalaim, Jerusalem
 1999 Godovich’s private gallery, Jerusalem
 1997 Exhibition on the occasion of the International Christian Conference, Palace of the Nathion, Jerusalem
 1995 “Landscape and Memory”, Art Village, Jerusalem
 1975 “Limbaji Landscapes”, Limbaji, Latvia
 1969 “State Ice Ballet Dancers”, Crystal Hall, Moscow

Selected group exhibitions 

 2014 "Crazy Colors – Spring", the General Exhibition Gallery Kiryat HaAmanim, Safed, the Exhibition at Migdalei Neeman, Tel Aviv
 2014 Two exhibitions "City in Motion", Cinema Hotel Tel Aviv
 2014 Art Festival in Eilat, "Eilat Presents Talents" Exhibitions* Hotel Dan Eilat, Eilat Conservatory, Eilat University
 2014 "Israeli Artists Come to Ariel", Ariel Geihal a Tarbut
 2014 The Art-Festival in Lighthouse Gallery (Old Jaffa Reveals its Secrets) Exhibitions* "Path", "Ripple"
 1999–2006 Safrai Gallery, Jerusalem
 1996–2007 Artist’s House Gallery, Jerusalem
 1999 Autumn Exhibition of the Jerusalem Artists, Institute for Israel Studies, Jerusalem
 1998 “Desert Mirrors”, Tova Osman’s, Efrat and Baprozdor Galleries, Tel-Aviv
 1997 David Gallery, Jerusalem
 1996 Exhibition of New Members of the International Association of Art, Artist’s House, Jerusalem
 1991 Exhibition of Moscow Artists, the Central Exhibition Hall Manezh, Moscow
 1985, 1981, 1975 “Moscow Artists Celebrate a Great Victory”, Kuznetsky most Exhibition Hall, Moscow
 1979, 1961 the All-Union Exhibition dedicated to the 50th Anniversary of the Soviet Circus, the Central Exhibition Hall Manezh, Moscow
 1957 the Jubilee Exhibition in the academy of Art, Moscow

Personal life 
Lipkind was married and had a daughter, Anna Khodorovsky Lipkind, also an artist.

References

External links 

 Paintings by Emmanuil Lipkind
 Emmanuil Lipkind’s Gallery
 Facebook
 upj.org.au
 imj.org.il – Israel Museum
 sem40.ru
 artru
 artchive.ru
 all-art.co.il

1928 births
2007 deaths
20th-century Russian painters
Russian male painters
21st-century Russian painters
Russian emigrants to Israel
20th-century Russian male artists
21st-century Russian male artists